Sit tibi terra levis (commonly abbreviated as S·T·T·L or S.T.T.L. or STTL) is a Latin inscription used on funerary items from ancient Roman times onwards. The English language translation is approximately "May the earth rest lightly on you" or "May the ground be light to you";   the more literal, word by word, translation, is sit "may be", tibi "to you", terra "ground, soil", levis "light" (in the sense of the opposite of "heavy").

Euripides' phrase "underwent all kinds of variations", especially in Latin poets like Propertius, Ovid, Martial, and Persius; although some minor variants like Sit Ei Terra Levis – abbreviated to SETL – are attested, and excluding Roman Africa which developed its own stock formula (Ossa Tibi Bene Quiescant – OTBQ – or similar), in Latin epitaphs the phrase became formulaic, acquiring the aforementioned abbreviation. On the contrary, in Greek epitaphs, it never became such a fixed formula; it is found in various forms, e.g. 

The Latin formula was usually located at the end of the inscription; at the beginning, another formulaic phrase was often used: Dis Manibus, i.e. "To the spirits of the dead"; first thus, then shortened to Dis Man and finally to DM. The latter, along with STTL, had replaced in about the mid-first century CE, the older model, common during the first century BCE and first century CE, of ending the inscription with Hic situs est or Hic sita est ("he or she lies here"; abbreviated to HSE),  and the name of the dead  person.

Notes and references
Notes

References

See also

RIP
Memento mori
Necropolis
Stele
Roman funerals and burial
Ancient Greek funeral and burial practices

Latin inscriptions
Latin mottos
Greek inscriptions
Ancient Roman religion
Ancient Greek religion
Death in ancient Rome
Death customs